The men's long jump at the 1938 European Athletics Championships was held in Paris, France, at Stade Olympique de Colombes on 3 September 1938.

Medalists

Results

Final
3 September

Participation
According to an unofficial count, 13 athletes from 10 countries participated in the event.

 (1)
 (2)
 (2)
 (1)
 (2)
 (1)
 (1)
 (1)
 (1)
 (1)

References

Long jump
Long jump at the European Athletics Championships